The Associated Collegiate Press (ACP) is the largest and oldest national membership organization for college student media in the United States.  The ACP is a division of the National Scholastic Press Association.  It awards the newspaper, magazine, and online National Pacemaker Awards, which are considered the highest honors a student publication can receive.

Membership fees are based on enrollment. Membership is also open to student publications outside the U.S.

External links

Student newspapers published in the United States
Student magazines published in the United States
University and college mass media in the United States